Michal Helfman (born 1973 in Tel Aviv) is an Israeli artist living and working in Tel Aviv, Israel. She is a multidisciplinary artist working in various disciplines including sculpture, architecture, video and drawings. In order to demonstrate the relations between the reviled and the hidden forces working within society and culture, she has developed an installation platform based on the back-stage front-stage structure of the theatrical stage as one, which brings together simultaneously both the real and the symbolic.

Helfman exhibited in numerous international exhibitions, including the 50th Biennale di Venezia, San Francisco's Institute of Visual Art, Fondazione Sandretto in Torino and the Institute of Visual Arts in the University of Wisconsin. She is currently a faculty member at the BFA and MFA programs of Bezalel Academy.

Career 

Tiesto (2000) was an exhibition shown in Sommer Contemporary Art in Tel Aviv. The show was named for a Dutch DJ well known in the international club scene. The gallery space is divided into three separate rooms, each of which relates to a different section of a dance club. The middle room, which visitors enter first, is done up as a sort of lounge, to the right is a darkened room showing a documentary video about laughing gas; and along the wall in the room on the left are faces, seemingly those of dances who have stopped for a moment to have a souvenir picture taken. The third room with plastic bags folded and glued into Plexiglas which were dysmorphic images of club goes, smiling for camera.

In 2005 Michal Helfman represented Israeli in the 50th Venice Biennale. Helfman’s installation was titled The Owl (2003), or “Kochav Yair” in Hebrew. In the middle of the room stands a metallic owl surrounded with mirrors in the form of dripping water. The mutual reflection creates a kaleidoscope effect. Above the owl there is a lighting fixture designed to look like an owl’s eye. For few minutes it will radiant with a strong, bright light that will almost blinds whoever enters the room, and then, for few minute the strong light will shut down and the owl will tell stories of wisdom. Michal Helfman juxtaposes an owl, the mysterious nocturnal bird that is an ancient Greek symbol of wisdom, with the glamorous nightclub world. Helfman’s owl, which she has fashioned in the style of the twentieth-century Israeli “Canaanite” movement, resembles a prehistoric fertility figure, are composed of a textured medium that mimics the pink Nubian sandstone of which Nimrod (Itzhak Danzinger, 1939) In the background Roy “Chicky” Arad reads his poem “The Owl,” a work that underscores the tension between the magnificent traditions of the ancient world and the false glitter of today’s consumer society.

In her installation Just Be Good to Me (2007) exhibited at The Israel Museum in Jerusalem in 2007, Helfman employed multiple disciplines and media, such as architecture, interior design, sculpture and drawing. The opening scene of the film, which was screened in the first room of the exhibition, shows Helfman herself dressed as a dancer (a variation of Edgar Degas' ballerinas) diapering her son in a nursing room as a life-size model in the midst of the desert. As the camera retreats, we see that what we thought was a house is in fact only a stage set in the middle of a desert landscape. The film takes place in the desert and may be characterized with reference to several genres: documentation of action, a family film, a video clip or an excerpt from a full-length feature film. The camera stays where it is, night falls gradually and unevenly, and the nightlight that formed part of the stage scenery is not the desert’s only source of illumination -- a lonely domestic light glowing in a vast open space. The camera moves skywards and the bright stars change into the dazzling globes we saw earlier, before being transformed into the balls of the mobile the baby was playing with at the beginning of the movie, which now starts all over again -- and so the cycle continues. In the background the 1980s pop song "Just Be Good to Me" is playing. Helfman immerses the viewer in the complex relationships between man and environment, space and action.

In 2013, Helfman was commissioned by the CCA Tel Aviv to create a site-specific installation titled Change. The large-scale piece was composed of sculpture, painting, drawing and video and touched on themes such as: migration, generational repetition and disillusionment. The show later installed in New York in 2015, where Helfman had her first solo show in the city.

Approach 
The film takes place in the desert and may be characterized with reference to several genres: documentation of action, a family film, a video clip or an excerpt from a full-length feature film. The refrain "Just be good to me" becomes this primal cry of a human being who depends on a relationship. The moment in which the mother and son disappear into the desert night, illustrates this mutual request. The artist transforms an image into an icon, in a symbol of dualism that exists between nature and culture, appearance and reality, single and collective. Between illusion, fiction and reality, Helfman immerses the viewer in the complex relationships between man and environment, space and action.

Often collaborating with senior Israeli choreographers, dancers, gymnasts, and musicians, as part of her longtime research on the potential relations between the physical and the visual, Helfman's works constantly challenge the perception of space and movement.

Education 

 1993-1997 BFA, Bezalel Academy of Art and Design, Jerusalem.

Selected solo exhibitions 

 2013 "Change", CCA Tel Aviv
 2012 "Experiments in Techniques of Awakenings," Yafo 23, Jerusalem
 2010 "Doctor Doctor," Sommer Contemporary Art, Tel Aviv
 2009 "The Lesson," Cardi Black Box, Milan
 2009 "The Lesson," Tel Aviv Museum of Art
 2008 "Mekomon", Art TLV
 2007 "Bat Dor", Israel Museum, Jerusalem
 2006 "Cochav Yair", Sommer Contemporary Art, Tel Aviv
 2002 Institute of Visual Arts, University of Wisconsin
 2001 Institute of Visual Art, San Francisco
 2000 "Tiesto", Sommer Contemporary Art, Tel-Aviv
 1999 "Iris", Herzlyia Museum of Contemporary Art
 1998 "God'amn This DJ, Make My Day",The Midrasha Gallery of Art, Tel Aviv

External links 
 
 Michal Helfman Artist Page at Sommer Contemporary Art Gallery Website

References 

Living people
1973 births
21st-century Israeli women artists
Israeli sculptors
Israeli painters
Israeli installation artists
Israeli women painters
Israeli women sculptors
Bezalel Academy of Arts and Design alumni
Artists from Tel Aviv